Anita Staps (born 5 April 1961) is a retired judoka from the Netherlands. She won a world title in 1980, when women's competitions were first introduced to the World Judo Championships, and finished in third place at the next three consecutive championships. Between 1978 and 1986 she won seven national titles.

She retired in 1987 and became physiotherapist and fitness trainer, eventually establishing her own company Stapsgewijs in 1993.

References

1961 births
Living people
Dutch female judoka
Sportspeople from Tilburg
World judo champions
20th-century Dutch women